Neil Mackay, 8th of Strathnaver, was in the 15th century the eighth chief of the ancient Clan Mackay, a Scottish clan of the Scottish Highlands. He is sometimes also recorded as Neil Bass Mackay or Neil Wasse Mackay which was a nickname taken from the fact that for a time he was a prisoner on the Bass Rock.

Early life and imprisonment

Neil Mackay, 8th of Strathnaver was the eldest son of Angus Du Mackay, 7th of Strathnaver and his wife Elizabeth, sister of Donald of Islay, Lord of the Isles. In 1427 his father, Angus Du Mackay, was called by James I of Scotland to a parliament at Inverness and King James having returned from captivity in England found his country in a very distracted state. The result was that although Angus Du Mackay was released, his son Neil was kept as a hostage and imprisoned on the Bass Rock. While Neil was kept as a prisoner his father’s cousins, Neil Neilson Mackay and Morgan Neilson Mackay, attempted to take over the Mackay lands of Strathnaver with the support of the Murrays of Aberscross and the Clan Sutherland. However, they were defeated by Angus’s forces who were led by his second son, John Mackay, I of Aberach at the Battle of Drumnacoub in 1433, although Angus was killed.

Neil Mackay remained in captivity for some years after his father’s death and in the meantime maintenance of the Mackay interests devolved upon his brother, John Mackay of Aberach.

Escape from the Bass Rock
In 1436, or 1437, King James was murdered at Perth and Neil Mackay escaped from imprisonment on the Bass Rock. This was apparently achieved with help from the wife of the governor, Lauder. John Mackay of Aberach handed over governance of the clan to Neil upon his return and Neil rewarded him with lands in Strathnaver.

In 1437, Neil Mackay having returned home led an expedition into Caithness at the head of his clansmen. This conflict became known as the Sandside Chase in which the Caithness men, believed to have been of the Clan Gunn, were defeated.

Family
Neil Mackay, 8th of Strahtnaver, married a daughter of George Munro, 10th Baron of Foulis, chief of Clan Munro, and his wife who was a daughter of Ross of Balnagown, chief of Clan Ross. They had the following children: 
Angus Roy Mackay, 9th of Strathnaver, who was killed at the Battle of Tarbat in 1486.
John Roy Mackay, who had a son called William Roy Mackay.
Elizabeth Mackay who married John MacGillion of Lochbuie, chief of the Clan Maclaine of Lochbuie.

See also
Chiefs of Clan Mackay
Clan Mackay

References

Clan Mackay
Mackay
Mackay